Meteorology (Latin: Meteorologica or Meteora) is a treatise by Aristotle. The text discusses what Aristotle believed to have been all the affections common to air and water, and the kinds and parts of the earth and the affections of its parts.  It includes early accounts of water evaporation, earthquakes, and other weather phenomena.

An Arabic compendium of Meteorology, called  and produced   by the Antiochene scholar Yahya Ibn al-Batriq, was widely circulated among Muslim scholars over the following centuries. This was translated into Latin by Gerard of Cremona in the 12th century – and by this means, during the Twelfth-century Renaissance, entered the Western European world of medieval scholasticism.  Gerard's "old translation" (vetus translatio) was superseded by an improved text by William of Moerbeke, the nova translatio, which was widely read, as it survives in numerous manuscripts; it received commentary by Thomas Aquinas and was often printed during the Renaissance.

Physics

In On the Universe (a possibly spurious work), Aristotle writes:

This is a reference to the unmoved movers, a teleological explanation. Although On the Universe is included in the Corpus Aristotelicum, its status as a genuine Aristotelian text is disputed.

Four elements

All terrestrial matter consists of these four elements.  Various ratios of the elements combine to create the diverse materials found in nature. Aristotle explains this in terms of the four primary contrary qualities, heat, cold, dryness, and moisture (Meteorology book 4 chapter 7); the first two being active causes and the latter being the underlying matter (378b10). Compositions of the elements in things like milk, blood, flesh, or metals will include both earth and water, and sometimes air. These composite bodies involve a form which combines contraries in the same body, i.e. both moisture and dryness (Aristotle explained the flexibility and ductility of metal by theorizing that it had moisture in its composition). They do so by forming proportions among the contraries. Flesh involves all four elements in a proportioned combination.

The theory of elements was meant to replace the Atomism of Democritus (which Aristotle refuted in On Generation and Corruption and De Caelo). The elements are not, therefore, tiny building blocks like atoms, but rather the constitutive properties (i.e. contraries) of the simple bodies (fire, air, water, earth) found in sense-perception. 

Meteorology deals primarily with the interaction of three elements: air, water, and earth. A cloud is a composite that mixes all three. Books 1-3 of Meteorology apply a method of explanation (contrary qualities) which explains different phenomena as an interaction of forces in a natural system (relations of agent and patient, potency, and activity). Thus the sun and air are "movers" within meteorological phenomena, while water and earth are "moved" and act as matter. Book 4 is a sustained investigation of the properties and effects of heat and cold on organic processes. In "Meteorologica" (1, 2) in free translation as follows: "They boil the sea water and suspend large sponges from the mouth of a brass vessel to absorb what is evaporated, and after drawing the liquid from the sponges they find it to be sweet water." This is a practical application of Aristotle's theory of distillation and that the rain cycle is some sort of natural distallation, without having said the word (Book 1, Chapter 9).

Atmosphere

Water vapor

Weather

Aristotle describes the properties of tornadoes and lightning.

Geology

Geography

Hydrology

Spherical Earth

Aristotle is describing a spherical lithosphere (Earth), hydrosphere (water) and atmosphere (air and fire).

Book 4 
The authorship of the fourth book is disputed. This is due partially to its content. It deals with an altogether different set of questions from the other three books, and is much more similar to On Generation and Corruption. Recently, its authenticity, or at the very least, its consistency with other Aristotelian texts, has been defended. Where exactly it should be placed in the corpus is another question. Alexander placed it with GC, but thought it was a different work from it. Olympiodorus placed it between Cael. and GC, while Patrizi placed it before Parts of Animals. Only Ammonius claims it is both genuine and in the right place.

The fourth book consists of a detailed investigation of organic and natural processes, and attempts to explain the interaction and composition of elements by reference to the contrary physical qualities. It also provides a theory of secondary qualities, which emerge from different compositions of the primary qualities. This means that hardness or brittleness are due to the underlying relations between the primary contraries (hot, cold, dry, and moist).

"The so-called fourth book of Aristotle's Meteorological is not about meteorological phenomena at all. It describes the formation out of the four elements of 'homoeomerous' substances, by which are meant minerals such as stones and metals, and organic substances like flesh, skin, and hair, and the changes they can undergo under the influence of heat, cold, and moisture."

Chapter analysis:

 Summary of the doctrine of four prime contraries (hot, cold, moist, dry) and their relation to the four elements (fire, air, water, earth). Hot and cold are the active factors responsible for generation and destruction.
 Two and Three are an investigation of the effects of heat and cold on natural processes, in particular, concoction [πέψις]. Concoction is defined as the maturing process [τελέωσις] of a substance which initiates its own development by means of an  inner heat, i.e. it is its own internal moving cause (379b18-25). The appropriate heat will  "masters the indeterminacy" of the material elements, so as to give them form (380a1). Proper concoction is a sign of health (380a2).
 Ripening is a specific kind of concoction [πέψις τις]: the process in which the nourishing elements in fruit attains maturity so that its seeds can produce life (380a11-15). Aristotle says we can speak metaphorically about other processes as maturation [τελέωσις], all processes in which "matter is determined by natural heat and cold" (280a18-22). The chapter then examines rawness as the antithesis of concoction: in-concoction of the nourishing element in fruit having indeterminate moisture (380a27-b13). He then investigates related processes in which external influences effect the inner equilibrium of forces in natural compounds:  boiling, scalding, and roasting.
 Four through Nine are an investigation of the passive factors, moisture and dryness, and develop a systematic explanation of their secondary properties, the primary two being hard and soft. 
 Aristotle says that hard and soft are produced by processes of solidification or liquefaction that are due to heat and coldness. Drying is one kind of solidification. 
 Further investigation of solidification and liquefaction. (1) watery liquids, which are solidified by cold, liquefied by heat. (2) In mixtures of earth and water (which may also thicken instead of solidifying), either earth dominates, or, in which water dominates.
 Discussion of particular examples: cheese, milk, blood, stones, wood, ebony, clay. Conclusion: anything that will solidify or thicken contains earth.
 Summary of his theories of hylomorphism and motion, as pertaining to the study of the physical properties of natural bodies. We are then given a list of the types of qualities that arise from the interactions between composite bodies. These are the effects of heat and cold on the passive components (moisture and dryness). The list is given in the form of a pair of opposites: "Capable or incapable of..."
 Solidification
 Melting
 Softening from heat
 Softening from cold
 Bending
 Breaking
 Fragmentation
 Impression
 Plasticity
 Being squeezed
 Ductility
 Malleability
 Fissility
 Being cut
 Viscosity
 Being compressed
 Combustability
 Giving off fumes
 Further investigation of the nature of solidification and softening. Examples: bronze, soda, salt, wool, grain. Then all 18 properties are investigated.
 Discusses homoiomerous bodies and the effects of heat and cold on the processes of solidification and liquification.
 Discusses examples (bronze, gold, silver, tin, iron, stone, flesh, bone sinew, skin, intestine, hair, fiber, veins) which are differentiated from non-homoiomerous bodies: everything composed of homoiomerous bodies, e.g. face hand, foot, or wood, bark, leaf, root. 
 Discusses non-homoiomerous bodies. In the middle of the chapter he insists on the existence of functions [ἔργον] and purposes [ἕνεκα] in all natural processes, claiming they are only clearer in the case of living things like flesh, but no less present in inanimate nature (390a17). Despite this insistence on final causality, the author goes on immediately to claim that all homoiomerous bodies can be produced by heat, cold, or their combination. The chapter ends the book by looking ahead to a further investigation of homoiomerous bodies (blood, flesh, semen, and the rest), which would lead into the study of non-homoiomerous, and then to bodies composed of them "such as humans, plants, and the like." (390b24).

See also
Classical compass winds
History of science
Mpemba effect
Timeline of meteorology

Notes

External links

Meteorology, translated by E. W. Webster (Alternate at mit.edu)
"Meteorologica", translated by E.W. Webster (Internet Archive, 1931)
Modern aspects of Aristotle's Meteorology
 

Works by Aristotle
Books about meteorology